98.6 may refer to:

 98.6°F, a historical value for the average normal human body temperature
 "98.6" (song), a song by Keith
 98.6, a novel by Ronald Sukenick
 98.6 ZHFM, a Classic Hits FM radio station in New Zealand
 DRG Class 98.6, a steam locomotive which has been renamed as Bavarian D VIII
 98.6 Degrees: The Art of Keeping Your Ass Alive, a survival book by Cody Lundin
 , a German radio station from Nuremberg